Toro Bravo was a Spanish restaurant in Portland, Oregon. The restaurant closed in 2020.

History

Toro Bravo opened in 2007.

The restaurant had received funding for provide food for the homeless community.

Reception
Toro Bravo was named one of the city's best restaurants by Portland Monthly Camas Davis in 2007 and by The Oregonian Michael Russell in 2016. The restaurant ranked number 23 on Russell's 2019 list of "Portland's 40 best restaurants".

See also

 Hispanics and Latinos in Portland, Oregon
 Impact of the COVID-19 pandemic on the restaurant industry in the United States
 List of defunct restaurants of the United States
 List of Spanish restaurants

References

External links
 
 

2007 establishments in Oregon
2020 disestablishments in Oregon
Defunct European restaurants in Portland, Oregon
Restaurants disestablished during the COVID-19 pandemic
Restaurants disestablished in 2020
Restaurants established in 2007
Spanish restaurants in the United States
Spanish-American culture in Portland, Oregon